Nikita Dmitrovich Chibrikov (born 16 February 2003) is a Russian ice hockey winger who plays for HC Spartak Moscow in the Kontinental Hockey League (KHL). He was selected by the Winnipeg Jets in the second round, 50th overall, of the 2021 NHL Entry Draft.

On 31 July 2022, Chibrikov was among 9 players traded by SKA Saint Petersburg to Spartak Moscow in exchange for Alexander Nikishin.

Career statistics

Regular season and playoffs

International

References

External links
 

2003 births
Living people
Ice hockey people from Moscow
Russian ice hockey left wingers
Russian ice hockey forwards
SKA Saint Petersburg players
SKA-Neva players
SKA-1946 players
HC Spartak Moscow players
Winnipeg Jets draft picks